Mahana is a 2016 New Zealand drama film directed by Lee Tamahori, and written by John Collee, based on the novel Bulibasha: King of the Gypsies by Witi Ihimaera. It was released as The Patriarch outside New Zealand.

Plot
The film tells the story of two Māori families, the Mahanas and the Poatas, who are bitter rivals. The enmity purportedly dates back to Tamihana Mahana falling in love with Ramona and rescuing her from her betrothed, Rupeni Poata, who she did not want to marry. By the late 1950s, Tamihana is the patriarch of the Mahana clan and runs a successful sheep shearing family business in the Gisborne District, while his headstrong grandson Simeon chafes under Tamihana's authoritarian rule.

As punishment for making snide remarks during the family's dinner prayer, Tamihana assigns Simeon household chores. While cleaning his grandmother's study, Simeon discovers a photograph of Ramona and Rupeni as a couple. Later, Simeon shows the photo to his mother Huria and his aunts. Huria chides her son for digging into family history and claims that his grandmother could not stand Rupeni. Simeon later asks his grandmother about the photograph, who is reluctant to talk about the matter but remarks that "men fight for what they want".

The following day, Tamihana assigns Simeon the task of transporting a slain sheep to his family at a distant shearing station. On the way, Simeon discovers Ramona's abandoned homestead. At the shearing station, Simeon learns that the Mahana shearers have sufficient meat supplies and that his grandfather sent him on a pointless errand. When Simeon vents his resentment towards his grandfather, his mother reminds him that Tamihana is the source of their livelihood.

Tamihana later allows Simeon and the other Mahana grandchildren to watch the Western film 3:10 to Yuma at the local cinema in town, but the screening is disrupted when a local youth, Mihaere Poata, rides his horse into the theatre. Chaos erupts, and Simeon takes the opportunity to kiss Poppy Poata amidst the frenzy. The next day, Simeon and his class visit the local courthouse as part of a school trip. (At the time, the Māori language was not permitted to be spoken in courtrooms, among other places.) One of the defendants is Mihaere Poata, who is sentenced to two years in prison for criminal mischief. Simeon is asked by his teacher, Mr. McKenzie, to address the judge on behalf of his class; however, rather than thank the judge for allowing the class to witness the proceedings of the New Zealand legal system, Simeon gives a moving speech criticizing Mihaere's overly harsh treatment and the ban on the Māori language. Outside the courthouse, Simeon is praised by both Mr McKenzie and Rupeni Poata for his courage.

Back at the Mahana family home, Tamihana, already displeased with Simeon for associating with Rupeni, attempts to punish his grandson by forcibly giving him a haircut when Simeon protests Tamihana's decree that the children are no longer allowed to attend the cinema. Simeon's father Joshua rushes to his son's defense and accidentally strikes Tamihana. As punishment, an enraged Tamihana disinherits Joshua, Huria, and their children, exiling them from the farm. Ramona intervenes and, over her husband's protests, bequeaths her house and land to Joshua and his family. Simeon and his family work hard to restore the dilapidated house. Ramona also visits Simeon's family to provide them with moral support. Simeon's aunt Miriam and her lover Pani later join Simeon's family when they are similarly banished.

One night while trying to repair a leak in their roof during a storm, Joshua falls to the ground and breaks his leg. Huria tells Simeon to get help from Tamihana; knowing his hard-hearted grandfather will not come, Simeon instead seeks help from Rupeni, who outfits Joshua with a Thomas splint. Joshua's injury forces Simeon and the rest of his family to seek the district's seasonal shearing contract in order to make enough money to survive, which usually goes to Tamihana's crews; this causes further friction between Joshua and Tamihana's respective families, but Joshua's family is eventually given the contract.

Some time later, at a local sheep-shearing competition in which Joshua, Simeon and Pani are entered in as contestants, Tamihana suddenly becomes gravely ill, and Ramona privately reveals to Simeon that Tamihana has terminal bowel cancer. Ramona also tells him the truth behind the Mahana-Poata rivalry; that she truly loved Rupeni and that Tamihana did not rescue her as most people believe, but actually forced himself on her, and that she, pregnant with Tamihana's child, was made by the family elders to marry him according to the traditions of the time. That night, on his deathbed, Tamihana reaches an understanding with his grandson, and gives him a letter hidden in a drawer; he passes away soon after. During Tamihana's funeral, the Poata clan, led by Rupeni, arrive unannounced. Before a fight can break out, Simeon stands up and reveals the contents of Tamihana's letter, which admitted his misdeed and also contained a written agreement between Tamihana and Ramona that she could return to Rupeni following his death. After some debate, Ramona speaks up for her grandson and confesses that she never loved Tamihana. The Mahanas and Poatas reconcile, and Rupeni praises Simeon for bringing peace to their two families. Rupeni and Ramona leave together, and Simeon begins dating Poppy.

Cast
 Temuera Morrison as Tamihana Mahana
 Akuhata Keefe as Simeon Mahana
 Nancy Brunning as Ramona Mahana
 Jim Moriarty as Rupeni Poata
 Regan Taylor as Joshua Mahana
 Maria Walker as Huria Mahana
 Sienna MacKinlay as Gloria Mahana
 Tuhiwhakauraoterangi Wallace-Ihakara as Hope Mahana
 Kyra McRae as Faith Mahana
 Eds Eramiha as Pani 
 Ngahuia Piripi as Miriam Mahana
 Yvonne Porter as Poppy Poata
 Te Kohe Tuhaka as Caesar Poata
 Fraser Brown as Mr. McKenzie
 Adam Gardiner as Dr. Gillespie
 Stephen Lovatt as Judge Hughes
 Edwin Wright as Defence Lawyer
 Aaron Ward as Prosecution Lawyer
 Paul Yates as Minister
 Greg Johnson as Golden Shears Commentator
 John Leigh as Golden Shears Announcer
 Alistair Browning as Mr. Mervyn Williams
 Matariki Whatarau as Mohi
 Peter Fifield as Background Extra 
 James Fifield as Background Extra

Production
Mahana was produced by the New Zealand-based production company Jump Film and Television. The movie was funded by several parties including the New Zealand Film Commission, New Zealand On Air, Māori Television, Entertainment One, Wild Bunch, and several private equity investors. In addition, Mahana was the first New Zealand film to be funded through the Snowball Effect equity crowdfunding platform. While the source novel Bulibasha: King of the Gypsies is set in New Zealand's Gisborne District, filming for Mahana took place in the countryside outside Auckland, the country's largest city.

Release and reception
Mahana has received positive reviews from critics. The movie received an 85% rating on the film review website Rotten Tomatoes. The movie was first screened at the 2016 Berlin Film Festival on February 13, 2016, prior to its New Zealand debut on March 3, 2016. The Guardian reviewer Henry Barnes awarded the film three out of five stars. Despite its simplistic and romantic storyline, Barnes described Mahana as a story that could apply to every family "whose male leader forgets that his role is to offer support, love and security—not hard-hearted rule." The Hollywood Reporter Dave Rooney described Mahana as an old-fashioned family saga with conflicting impulses. He criticized John Collee's script-writing, commenting that the "on-the-nose dialogue, ripe melodrama and preprogrammed emotional responses will test all but the most forgiving viewers".

Stuff.co.nz reviewer Graeme Tuckett praised the film, describing it as "having all its pieces present and correct". Tuckett also likened Mahana to Lee Tamahori's 1994 film Once Were Warriors and praised Ginni Loane's incorporation of landscapes and interior shots into the cinematography. However, Tuckett criticized the film for its predictable and melodramatic storyline. Newshub reviewer Kate Rodger awarded the film three out of five stars; praising the performance of the main cast including Temuera Morrison, Nancy Brunning, and Akuhata Keefe. Rodger also praised Loane's cinematography for immersing the viewer "entirely in the back blocks of New Zealand's rich farming heritage and lending a very tangible and convincing authenticity to the story." The New Zealand Herald reviewer described Mahana as a "Māori story with universal appeal" and credited the screenwriter John Collee for adapting Witi Ihimaera's novel Bulibasha: King of the Gypsies into a "tight family saga of promises broken and secrets kept."

The Sydney Morning Herald reviewer Paul Byrnes praised Mahana as a landmark film in Māori cinematography, describing it "as an engrossing narrative on a grand scale about quotidian lives." Byrnes also opined that the film dealt with manhood, masculinity, and feminine power within families.

References

External links
 
 

2016 films
2016 drama films
New Zealand drama films
Films set in New Zealand
Films shot in New Zealand
Films about Māori people
2010s English-language films
Films set in the 1950s